Leon Dexter Batchelor (May 8, 1884 – March 21, 1958) was an American horticulture professor. He was the longest-serving director of the University of California Citrus Experiment Station.

Early life and education
Batchelor was born in 1884 and grew up on a New England farm in Upton, Massachusetts. He attended the New Hampshire College of Agriculture and the Mechanic Arts, as did his older brother, chemist Harry David Batchelor (class of 1903). Both were members of Kappa Sigma. Batchelor also served as a cadet in the college's Reserve Officers' Training Corps Battalion, and was student manager of the 1906 New Hampshire football team. He earned his Bachelor of Science degree in 1907. He then attended Cornell University and earned his Doctor of Philosophy in 1911.

Career
Batchelor taught horticulture at Cornell from 1907 to 1910 and resigned to teach at Utah Agricultural College. While teaching at Utah, Batchelor published studies about thinning apple orchards. In 1915, he joined the University of California Citrus Experiment Station as an Associate Professor of Plant Breeding. Batchelor was promoted to Professor of Orchard Management in 1919 and to director of the Citrus Experimentation Station in 1929 to replace retiring director Herbert John Webber. Batchelor became a preeminent authority within California on the study of walnuts. He was named by the state director of agriculture in 1940 as the seventh member of the California Walnut Control Board. Batchelor remained director of the Citrus Experimentation Station until July 1, 1951, when he returned to research. Batchelor was selected as the University of California, Riverside's Faculty Research Lecturer for 1954.  Batchelor Hall on UC Riverside's campus is named after Batchelor, the longest-serving director of the Citrus Experimentation Station.

Selected published works

References

Citations

Bibliography

External links
 
 Draft registration card of September 1918 at fold3.com

1884 births
1958 deaths
People from Upton, Massachusetts
Cornell University alumni
University of New Hampshire alumni
American horticulturists
University of California, Riverside faculty